The Young Animals, also known as Born Wild, is a 1968 drama film directed by Maury Dexter. It was the second in a four picture deal he did with AIP and was filmed at Tucson, Arizona.

Plot

WASP Bruce (David Macklin) and his gang beat up Mexican-American Paco (Zooey Hall) and rape his girlfriend, Raquel (Joanna Frank). Super cool Latino Tony (Tom Nardini) comes to town and hits it off with the blonde Janet (Patty McCormack), who Bruce thinks is his girl. Bruce and his pals chase Tony down, but let him go with a warning to stay away from Janet. Tony decides to organize the Mexican-American students at school, and when principal Wilson (Arthur Petersen) refuses to even listen to their complaints, organizes a walk out by the Mexican-American students. The students picket the school and even brawl with Bruce's gang. After Raquel tells Janet that she was raped, some of the white students walk out in solidarity. Then Paco and a group of students who favor a more radical approach, attack Din-din (Keith Taylor), a member of Bruce's group and his girlfriend. Bruce and his followers get their revenge, killing Paco and Raquel in a staged road "accident". Bruce and his pals try to kill Tony and Janet, but in the end Bruce is arrested. Principal Wilson finally agrees to talk with the students and the walk out ends.

Cast
 Tom Nardini as Tony
 Patty McCormack as Janet
 Joanna Frank as Raquel
 David Macklin as Bruce
 Zooey Hall as Paco
 Arthur Petersen as Principal Wilson
 Keith Taylor as Din-din

According to IMDB, Cher appeared in this film as an uncredited extra.

References

External links
 
 
 Young Animals at TCMDB

1968 films
Films shot in Arizona
American drama films
Films directed by Maury Dexter
1960s English-language films
1968 drama films
American International Pictures films
1960s American films